Will is a drama television series about the (fictional) life of William Shakespeare in his early 20s. The series was ordered for a first season, consisting of ten episodes, on May 18, 2016. It premiered on TNT on July 10, 2017, and concluded on September 4, 2017. It was originally ordered to series at Pivot in 2013 but was never broadcast. On September 5, 2017, the series was canceled after one season.

Plot
Young William Shakespeare is a struggling playwright who tires of making gloves in order to support his wife and three children. He travels to London and sells one of his plays to a theatre owned by James Burbage. In doing so, he befriends the rest of the company, pushes out the previous playwright and falls in love with Burbage's daughter, Alice. While seeking fame and fortune in London, Will keeps his Catholicism secret from those who would threaten to kill him and exploit his connection to the wanted Robert Southwell. As he makes a name for himself, he finds that he is saddled with saving a dying theater company and finding a place in a city that is hostile to his religion.

Cast

Main
Laurie Davidson as William Shakespeare
Olivia DeJonge as Alice Burbage
Ewen Bremner as Richard Topcliffe
Mattias Inwood as Richard Burbage 
Jamie Campbell Bower as Christopher Marlowe
William Houston as Kemp
Lukas Rolfe as Presto
Max Bennett as Robert Southwell
Colm Meaney as James Burbage

Recurring
 Nancy Carroll as Ellen Burbage
 Michael Nardone as Edward Arden
 Jamie Beamish as Augustine Phillips
 Nicholas Farrell as Francis Walsingham
 Nicholas Woodeson as Philip Henslowe
 Henry Lloyd-Hughes as Edward Alleyn
 Bruce MacKinnon as Robert Greene
 Deirdre Mullins as Anne Shakespeare 
 James Berkery as Jeremy Knightstand
 Zubin Varla as Edward Kelley
Jasmin Savoy Brown as Emilia Bassano
Kenneth Collard as Justice Young
Leon Annor as Marcus
Vauxhall Jermaine as Demetrius

Episodes

Reception
The series has received mixed-to-positive reviews from critics. On the review aggregation website Rotten Tomatoes, the series has a rating of 61%, based on 28 reviews, with an average rating of 6.22/10. Metacritic, which assigns a rating out of 100 to reviews from mainstream critics, reported that there were "generally favorable reviews" for the series, with an average score of 62 based on 27 reviews.

See also
Upstart Crow, a British sitcom about William Shakespeare
 Will Shakespeare (TV series), a 1978 six-part historical drama

References

External links
 
 
 

2010s American drama television series
2010s American LGBT-related drama television series
2017 American television series debuts
2017 American television series endings
Cultural depictions of William Shakespeare
English-language television shows
TNT (American TV network) original programming
Television series by Studio T